Christopher John Pethick (born 22 February 1942 in Horsham, UK) is a British theoretical physicist, specializing in many-body theory, ultra-cold atomic gases, and the physics of neutron stars and stellar collapse.

Education and career
Pethick studied at the University of Oxford, where he received his BA in 1962 and his PhD in 1965. He was then a postdoc at Magdalen College, Oxford and at the University of Illinois at Urbana-Champaign, where he was an associate professor from 1970 to 1973, a full professor from 1973 to 1995, and an adjunct professor from 1995 to 1998. For two academic years from 1970 to 1972 he was a Sloan Research Fellow. In 1973 he also became a professor at Nordita and then for many years divided his time between Nordita and the University of Illinois at Urbana-Champaigne. He was director of Nordita from 1989 to 1994. He then worked, until his retirement, at the Niels Bohr Institute in Copenhagen (with which Nordita was closely associated before moving to Stockholm). He was for the academic year 1973–1974 a visiting researcher at Moscow's Landau Institute for Theoretical Physics and in 1995 a visiting scientist at the Institute for Nuclear Theory (INT), located in Seattle on the campus of the University of Washington.

In 2008 he was awarded the Lars Onsager Prize for "fundamental applications of statistical physics to quantum fluids, including Fermi liquid theory and ground-state properties of dilute quantum gases, and for bringing a conceptual unity to these areas." (Gordon Baym and Tin-Lun Ho also won the Onsager Prize for 2008.) In 2011 Pethick received the Hans A. Bethe Prize for "fundamental contributions to the understanding of nuclear matter at very high densities, the structure of neutron stars, their cooling, and the related neutrino processes and astrophysical phenomena." In 2015 he was awarded the Feenberg Medal "for his pioneering contributions and profound insights into many-body physics across diverse physical systems, ranging from ultracold atoms and quantum liquids to dense nuclear matter in neutron stars and stellar collapse".

In 2013 he was elected an honorary foreign members of the American Academy of Arts and Sciences. Pethick is since 1977 a member of the Royal Danish Academy of Sciences and Letters and since 2003 a member of the Norwegian Academy of Language and Literature. In 1985 he was elected a Fellow of the American Physical Society for "his extensive contributions to the theory of condensed matter systems, ranging from low temperature helium and superconductors to condensed astrophysical objects and nuclear matter." In 2016 he was elected a member of the American Philosophical Society.

Selected publications

Articles

Books
 with Gordon Baym:   
 with H. Smith:   hbk

References

1942 births
Living people
20th-century British physicists
21st-century British physicists
Theoretical physicists
Alumni of the University of Oxford
University of Illinois Urbana-Champaign faculty
Fellows of the American Academy of Arts and Sciences
Fellows of the American Physical Society
Members of the American Philosophical Society
Members of the Norwegian Academy
Members of the Royal Danish Academy of Sciences and Letters